Nina Linta Lazarević (aka Nina Lazarević; born on 20 August 1976 in Belgrade, [then part of PR Serbia] in Yugoslavia) is a Serbian theater, film, and television actress, theatrical producer and playwright.

Linta graduated from Belgrade's Faculty of Drama Arts in 2002, and during her career played many roles in theater.

Selected filmography 
 Nije kraj (2008) 
 Gorki plodovi (serija) (2008)
 Zvezda Tri (2009)
 Kako su me ukrali Nemci (2011)
 The November Man (2014)
 Non chiedere perchè (alias L'angelo di Sarajevo) (2015)

References

External links 
 Nina Linta Lazarević at the Internet Movie Database

1976 births
Living people
Actresses from Belgrade
Writers from Belgrade
Serbian producers
21st-century Serbian actresses
Serbian film actresses